Major William John Charles Kennedy-Cochran-Patrick DSO, MC & Bar (25 May 1896 – 26 September 1933) was a Scottish First World War flying ace, credited with 21 aerial victories. He was the leading ace flying the Spad VII fighter, and of No. 23 Squadron. He later flew aerial surveys on three continents.

Early life and service
Kennedy-Cochran-Patrick was born in Beith, Ayrshire, Scotland on 25 May 1896, the only son of Neil James Kennedy-Cochran-Patrick (later Sir Neil) and Eleonora Agnes Kennedy-Cochran-Patrick of Woodside and Ladyland. He had three sisters, all younger.

He attended Wellington College in Berkshire and Trinity College, Cambridge before training at the Royal Military College, Sandhurst.

Flying service
Kennedy-Cochran-Patrick qualified as a pilot in April 1915. He was so skilled a flier that he was assigned as chief test pilot to No. 1 Aeroplane Depot at Saint-Omer, France. He was officially seconded to the Royal Flying Corps from The Rifle Brigade on 11 June 1915.

On 17 March 1916, he was promoted from second lieutenant to lieutenant while staying seconded to the RFC. On 26 April, he achieved his first victory despite his test pilot status. He used Nieuport No. 5172 to attack an LVG C-type three times. The LVG crash-landed with a dead crew. He was awarded the Military Cross on 16 May 1916, for this capture of an enemy plane.

As a result of his victory and award, he was transferred to No. 70 Squadron to fly Sopwith 1½ Strutters. He scored victories two and three on 14 and 15 September 1916, having his observer killed on both occasions.

He was promoted to captain and transferred to No. 23 Squadron in early 1917 to fly Spad VIIs. He shot a double on 22 April to become an ace. He won twice more in April, and again on 2 May. His next victory, on 11 May, would be his most notable; he set afire the Albatros D.III of Jasta 5's triple-ace Offz. Stlvtr. Edmund Nathanael, its fuselage falling away from its wings and plunged in flames to earth.

It was also during this stretch that he was entrusted by Major General Hugh Trenchard to evaluate the new Spad XIII at La Bonne Maison Aerodrome. He turned in his report to Trenchard on 1 May 1917.

Kennedy-Cochran-Patrick claimed three more times in May, four times in June, and five in July. After his final victory, on 16 July 1917, he was promoted to acting Major on 22 July, and given command of No. 60 Squadron.

In lieu of a second award, he was awarded a Bar to his Military Cross on 14 August 1917. A month later, on 17 September he was awarded the Distinguished Service Order.

He was Mentioned in Despatches on 7 November 1917 by Field Marshal Sir Douglas Haig. He was denoted as a lieutenant doing a job two grades his senior; he was a temporary major.

At the end of 1917 he was transferred back to England to the Training Directorate of the Air Board. From there, he returned to No. 1 AD in 1918.

His war time tally was 1 captured, 6 and 4 shared destroyed, 9 and 1 shared 'out of control'.

Postwar life
He resigned his commission on 9 July 1919. He became a major in the General Reserve of Officers the same day.

He married Natalie Bertha Tanner of Larches, Rusherville, Kent on 20 July 1924. They had a single son two years later, Neil Aylmer Kennedy-Cochran-Patrick (later Neil Aylmer Hunter).

He went on to fly a lot of aerial survey work in the postwar years. He carried out surveys in South America, Burma, Iraq, and Africa. He established his own company, The Aircraft Operating Company of South Africa Pty Ltd. He had a contract for a  air route survey in Northern Rhodesia (now Zambia).

He was elected to membership of the Royal Aero Club on 10 December 1930.

Then, on 26 September 1933, he took off from Baragwanath Airport near Johannesburg, South Africa, flying a de Havilland DH.84 Dragon, registration ZS-AEF. He stalled out at  after making a steep turn. The resulting crash killed him and his passenger, Sir Michael Oppenheimer, 2nd Baronet.

Honours and awards
Military Cross (MC)

 
Military Cross (MC) Bar

Distinguished Service Order (DSO)

Notes

References
 
 
 Guttman, Jon.(2002) SPAD XII/XIII Aces of World War I. Osprey Publishing. .

1896 births
1933 deaths
Military personnel from North Ayrshire
British Army personnel of World War I
British World War I flying aces
Scottish flying aces
People educated at Wellington College, Berkshire
Companions of the Distinguished Service Order
Graduates of the Royal Military College, Sandhurst
People from Beith
Recipients of the Military Cross
Rifle Brigade officers
Royal Flying Corps officers
Aviators killed in aviation accidents or incidents
Victims of aviation accidents or incidents in 1933